, real name , was a Japanese actress. She appeared in more than 90 films beginning in 1959.

Career
Born in Tokyo but raised in Kobe, Hoshi made her film debut in 1958 at Toho.

Hoshi died in Kyoto, Japan, at age 74.

Selected filmography

Film

Television

References

External links
 Official profile 
 

1943 births
2018 deaths
Actresses from Tokyo
Japanese film actresses
Japanese television actresses